The 1999 Pentecost flood was a 100-year flood around the Pentecost season in 1999 that mostly affected Bavaria, Vorarlberg and Tirol. It was caused by heavy rainfall coinciding with the regular Alpine meltwater.

By late May, the annual spring meltwater from the Alps meant many Bavarian rivers were already at a high water level. On May 22 the rainstorm "Quartus" hit the northern Alps, bringing an additional 180 litres/m2, causing the Ammersee and the Amper and Isar rivers to expand and flood large areas. These flooded areas expanded quickly covering parts of the Oberallgäu on the river Iller. The flood then continued downstream to some of the more inhabited areas in Bavaria.

The water level of the Isar, which flows through Munich, was lowered by the Sylvensteinspeicher reservoir near Bad Tölz. However causeways on the Iller failed, flooding Sonthofen, parts of Augsburg and Neustadt. In Hindelang-Hinterstein the flood reached a peak not recorded in the previous 250 years.
A subsequent Alpine highwater on 23–24 August 2005 again did damage to these areas.

In the Vorarlberg area the Rhine flood affected Lake Constance damaging Hard and Bregenz.

In Tirol the village Pflach in Lechtal was flooded.

References

External links  
 
Wasserwirtschaftsamt Freising: Pfingsthochwasser an der Amper Mai 1999
Kelheim: Pfingsthochwasser in Kelheim und Neustadt im Mai 1999
Hochwassernachrichtendienst Bayern: Pfingsthochwasser 1999 – ein Jahrhundertereignis an Iller, Ammer und Donau
Jahrhunderthochwasser in Ulm

Pentecost
Floods in Europe
Floods in Austria
Floods in Germany
Pentecost floods
Pentecost floods
May 1999 events in Europe
1999 in Austria 
1999 in Germany 
1999 disasters in Austria 
1999 disasters in Germany